The 1939 European Amateur Boxing Championships were held in Dublin, Ireland from 18 to 22 April. It was the sixth edition of the bi-annual competition was organised by the European governing body for amateur boxing, EABA. There were 71 fighters from 12 countries participating.

Medal winners

Medal table

References

External links
Results
EABA Boxing

European Amateur Boxing Championships
Boxing
European Amateur Boxing Championships
International boxing competitions hosted by Ireland
Boxing in County Dublin
European Amateur Boxing Championships
Box
1930s in Dublin (city)